Sohail Sen (born 24 June 1984) is an Indian film composer, musician and singer who works in Bollywood. He debuted as a film composer with the Hindi film Sirf (2008), which went majorly
unnoticed. Later, he gained fame as a Hindi film composer, with his acclaimed work in What's Your Raashee? (2009). He is also known for composing the popular soundtracks of Mere Brother Ki Dulhan, Ek Tha Tiger, and Gunday.

Early life
Sen comes from a family of musicians who have worked in the film industry and his entry into the film composing world marked the fourth generation of his family to do so. His father, Sameer Sen (of the music director duo Dilip Sen-Sameer Sen) has always been a strong influence in his life, as was his paternal grandfather Shri Shambhu Sen's singing.

Sen started learning music at the age of six. He learnt to play the tabla as a child, and then went on to learn various musical instruments including the piano and percussion and rhythm instruments. He learnt classical music from his grandfather Shri Shambhu Sen. He began his career as a music director at the young age of thirteen when he composed the music for a telefilm titled Roshni and for which renowned singer Kavita Krishnamurthy provided playback. He then decided to assist his father for nine years to fine-tune his skills as a film composer.

Career
In 2008, Sen began his career as a film composer, with the Hindi film Sirf, however, the film was supposed to be released in 2006, but it got delayed badly and was released in 2008 and eventually the music went unnoticed. He also composed the music for The Murderer (2009), which also got delayed and the music went unnoticed.

In 2009, he got a turning point, in his career as a film composer, when director Ashutosh Gowariker approached him for his film What's Your Raashee?. Initially he wanted his all-time favourite composer A. R. Rahman to compose for the film, but Rahman couldn't do it, because he wanted to compose for Danny Boyle's Slumdog Millionaire instead. So, he started looking for someone who is capable and can contribute all his time for composing in his film alone. Sen was always keen to work with Ashutosh Gowariker and incidentally his father Sameer Sen knew him from before and knowing that Gowariker was looking for someone to compose for his film, Sen asked his father to fix a meeting with him. His first meeting with Gowariker was a casual one at his office, it was where he told him that he would like to make him listen to some of his compositions. Gowariker immediately agreed to visit his studio the next morning. The next day, when he went to Sen's studio and heard some of his tunes, he really liked what he heard and after a couple of weeks later, Gowariker called up Sen and said "You are on for this project". For Sen, it was a dream come true.
At first Sen was thrilled of getting the offer, but when he was told that there would be 13 songs in the movie, one song for each of the 12 zodiac signs and then one song in which the lead protagonist makes the final choice, he was taken aback, since nowadays its quite rare to hear 13 different songs in one album and that itself was a difficult task, and again, it was an equally difficult task to create 13 distinct songs, each for one particular zodiac sign and then incorporating the flavor of all these 12 songs into that final song, was the most toughest task, however he took it up as a challenge and started working on the music, which took more than one and a half years in the making.

The soundtrack of the film, was released in August 2009 and irrespective of the box office status of the film, it has been able to garner mostly positive critical responses. Bollywood Hungama quoted the album as "interestingly done" and "an experience not to be missed". BBC Music praised Sen's work and quoted him as "Sen shows he can successfully compete with the best in Bollywood". Besides composing the soundtrack and the film score, Sen even sang most of the songs in the film.

In 2010, director Ashutosh Gowariker roped him again, for his period piece film Khelein Hum Jee Jaan Sey, based on the Chittagong Uprising of 1930. The soundtrack of which met with positive critical responses.

In 2011, he has had a major release with a top banner Yash Raj Films – Mere Brother Ki Dulhan, the music of which got appreciation from both critics and masses. The songs "Dhunki", "Isq Risk" and title track were chartbusters. In 2012, he replaced Pritam as the music director for Salman Khan's next film Ek Tha Tiger, since Pritam had date problems with both Yash Raj projects Ek Tha Tiger and Dhoom 3. The soundtrack received unanimously positive reviews. In 2014, Sen will team up with Ali Abbas Zafar once again after Mere Brother Ki Dulhan for Gunday, which features Ranveer Singh, Arjun Kapoor, Priyanka Chopra, and Irrfan Khan. While Sen will become music composer for the Hindi theatrical release of Gunday, Bappi Lahiri will compose full Bengali songs for the film, as it is also to be released in Bengali. This marks the first time Bappi Lahiri will work with Yash Raj Films.

Discography

As music director

As playback singer

Awards and nominations

References

External links
 
 Sohail Sen at WN
 Musically Yours: Sohail Sen

1984 births
Living people
Bollywood playback singers
Indian film score composers
Indian male playback singers
Singers from Mumbai
Bengali musicians
Singers from Kolkata
Bengali Hindus
Indian male film score composers